Christian Silva (born August 2, 1989) is an American soccer player.

Career

College and Amateur
Silva played one season at the University of Tampa before transferring to the University of South Florida. Silva forwent his final year of collegiate eligibility.

In Germany, Silva attracted the attention of Hannover 96, Dieter Schatzschneider. Trial for Hannover 96 U-23, coached by Andreas Bergmann. Bergmann decided to keep Silva until the winter pause of the 2011–2012 Regionalliga Nord season. Valérien Ismaël was soon after appointed head coach and did not offer Silva a contract. SV Werder Bremen U-23 trial in January 2012. 

Silva also appeared for USL PDL club Ocala Stampede in 2012 before suffering a MCL tear.

Professional
Silva signed with USL Pro club VSI Tampa Bay FC in 2013, the club folded at the end of the 2013 season.

In 2014, he moved to Swedish side Karlstad BK where he played 12 matches and contributed two goals during his time with the club.

Silva signed with United Soccer League side Rochester Rhinos on March 24, 2015. He suffered an ACL tear on May 20, 2015 while playing in the first round of U.S. Open Cup and was forced to miss the remainder of the season where the Rhinos would go on to win the USL Championship.

In January 2016, United Soccer League side Orange County Blues FC announced the signing of Silva. It was announced August 3, 2016 that Silva had completed a transfer to United Soccer League side Arizona United, under head coach Frank Yallop and assistant Marc Bircham

References

External links
 
 Rochester Rhinos profile

1989 births
Living people
American expatriate sportspeople in Sweden
American soccer players
Association football midfielders
Jacksonville Armada FC players
Karlstad BK players
Lansing Ignite FC players
Ocala Stampede players
Orange County SC players
Phoenix Rising FC players
Rochester New York FC players
Soccer players from Tampa, Florida
South Florida Bulls men's soccer players
Tampa Spartans men's soccer players
USL Championship players
USL League One players
USL League Two players
VSI Tampa Bay FC players